Vaino Vahing (15 February 1940 – 23 March 2008), was an Estonian writer, prosaist, psychiatrist and playwright. 
Starting from 1973, he was a member of the Estonian Writers Union.

Early life
Vlahing was born in Aravu, Põlva County.  In 1963 he attended the University of Tartu, Faculty of Medicine, qualifying as a Doctor of Medicine in 1969.
 1963–1965 – head of department and deputy of the doctor-director at the psycho-neurological clinic in Jämejala
 1965–1967 – doctor at the Tartu psychiatry clinic
 1967–1975 – expert in forensic psychiatry
 1968–1981 – lecturer and later docent at the Institute of Psychiatry of the University of Tartu

Vahing wrote many articles about psychiatry, but also literature, including novels, books and plays with psychiatric and autobiographical influences.

He acted in several Estonian films. He died in Tartu.

List of works
  (Perioodika 1970)
  (Eesti Raamat 1972)
  (Perioodika 1973)
  (Eesti Raamat 1990)
  (Ilmamaa 1995)
  (Ilmamaa 1997)
  (Eesti Raamat 1990)
  (Eesti Keele Sihtasutus 2002)
 
  (Perioodika 2004)
  (Ilmamaa 2005)
  (Vagabund 2006)
  (2006)
  (2007)

Honors
 Estonian White Cross, fourth category

Personal
Vahing was married to writer Maimu Berg and actress Heli Vahing. From his marriage with Berg he had a daughter, Julia Laffranque, former justice in the Supreme Court of Estonia and current European Court of Human Rights judge.

References

Estonica Literature:The Fifties and Sixties

1940 births
2008 deaths
People from Räpina Parish
Estonian male novelists
Estonian dramatists and playwrights
Estonian psychiatrists
20th-century Estonian novelists
20th-century dramatists and playwrights
21st-century Estonian novelists
21st-century dramatists and playwrights
Male dramatists and playwrights
20th-century male writers
21st-century male writers
University of Tartu alumni
Recipients of the Order of the White Star, 4th Class